Legislative Assembly elections were held in Uttar Pradesh in May 1980. The Indian National Congress remained the largest party, winning 309  of the 425 seats.

Results

Elected members

References

State Assembly elections in Uttar Pradesh
Uttar Pradesh